Mark Laff (born Mark Red Laffoley; 19 May 1958) is a retired English drummer and former member of several rock bands, including Generation X.

Early life and career 
Mark Red Laffoley was born on 19 May 1958 at Barnet General Hospital, at Chipping Barnet in the County of Hertfordshire. He received his formal education at Christ Church (Church of England) Secondary School in North Finchley.

He began playing drums as a teenager, being influenced by England's 1960s Mod fashion and music movement and the work of Keith Moon. After a failed audition for The Clash (he was one of two drummers to get a call back), his first drumming role was with Subway Sect, sharing the bill with the Sex Pistols, The Clash, and Siouxsie and the Banshees for the Anarchy and White Riot tours, however he left the band shortly afterwards.

Generation X 
In April 1977, the 18-year-old Laff was recruited as a replacement drummer for the punk rock band Generation X, a few months before it signed to Chrysalis Records and released its first single, Your Generation. He was Generation X's drummer through its two long-players, the self-titled Generation X (1978), followed by Valley of the Dolls (1979); which saw the band amidst a heavy performance schedule across Great Britain gaining momentum, drawing recognition and impacting the British pop music charts with its releases. However, after the relative commercial failure of the Valley of the Dolls long-player, internal disagreements about the band's musical direction and personality clashes within it came to a head in late 1979 during the recording of its abortive third long-player (which would be released retrospectively 20 years later under the title K.M.D. - Sweet Revenge). Lead guitarist Bob "Derwood" Andrews quit the band in December 1979, followed by Laff in January 1980, when he was asked to leave after a disagreement with the act's frontman/singer Billy Idol and bass player Tony James over song-writing credits for the band's recorded work. With Laff and Andrews' departure, Generation X essentially came to an end; a re-branded act, Gen X, with a replacement guitarist and drummer subsequently launched by Idol and James went on to fail commercially, and was gone by early 1981.

Empire 
After leaving Generation X Laff and Andrews played together as session musicians on Jimmy Pursey's solo long-player, Imagination Camouflage. In mid-1980 they set up a new band entitled Empire, recruiting bassist Simon Bernal to complete the line-up. A single entitled Hot Seat  was released, followed by a musically influential but commercially unsuccessful album entitled Expensive Sound. The trio undertook four gigs before Bernal left. After a number of line-up changes of personnel and more concerts, but little commercial success, Laff left Empire's line-up in February 1983, and band was ended by Andrews in 1984.

Twenty Flight Rockers 
In 1985 Laff founded a new retro rock & roll/rockabilly band called Twenty Flight Rockers with the singer/frontman Gary Twinn. The band released via ABC Records the single 'Tower Block Rock' (1985) (ranked #31 for Best Single of that year by Rockerilla Magazine, but making no impact on the UK Singles' Chart), and another single entitled 'Johnny 7' via WEA Records in 1986, which was also a commercial failure. In March 1986 the band released the song 'Searching for a Hero' in cassette format on a compilation L.P. advertising new bands entitled Spools Gold, given away free with the Record Mirror. Bernie Rhodes, who Laff knew back from his early days with Subway Sect was hired to manage them, and arranged the signing of the band with Epic Records.The band recorded a series of sessions, and a self-produced studio album entitled Ride, which was scheduled for commercial release in 1988, however Epic Records in the meantime was bought out by Sony, which subsequently opted to drop the band from the label, leading to Twenty Flight Rockers breaking up.

The Ride L.P. would not see the light of day until 2001 when it was put out by Revel Yell Music as a retrospective release under the title Twenty Flight Rockers. In 2004 'Revel Yell' released a second retrospective L.P. from the band entitled Twenty Flight Rockers – The New York Sessions 1988.

Later career 
On 20 September 1993, during Billy Idol's No Religion tour, Laff played with a re-formed Generation X in a reunion concert at the Astoria Theatre in London's West End.

In 2006 Laff re-recorded the song 'Hot Seat' with Derwood Andrews to commemorate the 25th anniversary of the release of Empire's Expensive Sound L.P., which was re-released on the Expansive Sound Volume II compilation L.P.

Laff briefly reunited with Vic Godard in 2007 to re-record Subway Sect's previously unreleased debut album under the title 1978 Now.

In 2019, he joined the touring line-up of LAMF, a band fronted by Walter Lure of The Heartbreakers which also featured Mick Rossi, former guitarist of Slaughter & The Dogs. This band played several gigs, including an appearance at the Rebellion Festival in Blackpool.

Post-music career 
Laff semi-retired from professional music in 2004, and went into business as the director of a holistic lifestyle therapy company in Brighton in East Sussex.

Discography 
Generation X
1978 – Generation X (Chrysalis Records)
1979 – Valley of the Dolls (Chrysalis Records)
1998 – Sweet Revenge (Empty Records) (Originally recorded in 1979.)
2004 – K.M.D. – Sweet Revenge Xtra (Revel Yell Music) (Featuring bonus tracks.)
Generation X Compilations
1985 – The Best of Generation X (Chrysalis Records)
1990 – The Idol Generation (Castle Communications) (Australia only.)
1991 – Perfect Hits 1975–81 (Chrysalis Records)
1999 – Live at the Paris Theatre '78 & '81 (EMI Records) (Reissued (and edited) in 2002 as One Hundred Punks – BBC Live in Concert.)
2002 – Radio 1 Sessions (Strange Fruit Records)
2003 – Anthology (EMI Records)
2003 – Live at Sheffield (Empty Records)

Empire
1981 – Expensive Sound (Dinosaur Discs) (American reissue in 1986 by Highway 61 Records)
2003 – Expensive Sound (Poorly Packaged Products) (Featuring bonus tracks.)
2009 – Expansive Sound Volume II (Poorly Packaged Products)

Twenty Flight Rockers
2001 – Twenty Flight Rockers (Revel Yell Music) (Originally recorded in 1988 as Ride.)
2004 – Twenty Flight Rockers – The New York Sessions 1988 (Revel Yell Music)

Subway Sect
2007 – 1978 Now (Overground Records)

Subway Sect Compilations
1999 – Twenty Odd Years – The Story Of... (Motion Records)
2011 – Live and Rare Vol 1 (Gnu Inc. Recordings)
2012 – Live and Rare Vol 2 (Gnu Inc. Recordings)

References

External links 
Mark Laff – Discogs.com
[ Review of Empire's album at allmusic.com]
 Twenty Flight Rockers Myspace page

1958 births
English punk rock drummers
Generation X (band) members
Living people
People from Chipping Barnet
People from Finchley
Musicians from Hertfordshire
Subway Sect members